Chris Birchall (born 25 March 1981) is a former Scotland international rugby league player. For a period he switched codes to play rugby union; and made one appearance for Glasgow Warriors in 2003-04 season.

Background
He was Scottish-Qualified as his grandmother was born in Kirkcudbright.

Rugby League career

Professional career
He played once for Bradford Bulls in 2000.

Birchall played for Halifax in 2002 and 2006.

International career

He played twice for Scotland internationally. In 2004 he won the Dave Valentine Award, given by the management of the Scotland national rugby league team to their player of the year.

Rugby Union career

Amateur career

While at the Warriors his contract allowed him to play for amateur club Glasgow Hutchesons Aloysians, and he made several appearances for the Giffnock club.

Birchall left Glasgow to join Otley in England.

Professional career

In 2003, Birchall switched codes to join Glasgow Warriors as a Prop on a short-term contract. He made just one appearance for the first team.

References

1981 births
Living people
Bradford Bulls players
English people of Scottish descent
English rugby league players
English rugby union players
Featherstone Rovers players
Glasgow Hutchesons Aloysians RFC players
Glasgow Warriors players
Halifax R.L.F.C. players
Scotland national rugby league team players